The Meteoro-class offshore patrol vessel, also known as Buque de Acción Marítima (BAM), are new modular offshore patrol vessels of the Spanish Navy adapted to different purposes from a common base, manufactured by Navantia. The BAMs combine high performance with mission versatility, a high commonality with other ships operated by the Spanish Navy. Acquisition and lifecycle costs are reduced.

Description 

The BAMs are a common platform for a variety of missions, used to develop whole families of types of ships that meet the diverse needs of the Navy.

Its main missions are:

 Protection and escort of other ships in low intensity/asymmetric warfare situations
 Control of maritime traffic
 Control and neutralization of terrorism and piracy
 Operations against drug trafficking and human trafficking
 Search and rescue
 Support for crisis situations and humanitarian aid
 Control of fishing laws
 Control of environmental legislation and anti-pollution.

Modular design enables the ships to be modified for purposes outside main missions such as hydrographic research, intelligence gathering, diving support and salvage operations.

Building

The BAM project consists of 12 vessels.

First phase
The first phase included the construction of six patrol boats. This phase was completed in January 2019 after twelve years.

Second phase
Like the first phase, this second is composed of six units. four of them are patrol boats and the two remaining are specialized BAMs, one oceanographic and the other underwater rescue.

Characteristics of the Oceanographic BAM
 Flight cover for medium helicopter (Lynx) without hangar.
 Transportation personnel: 20 Scientists.
 Scientific Premises: Biological, Humid with Cava, Electronic, Geological, Meteorological, Photographic laboratories.
 Drawing Room, Data Center, Local Electronic Equipment, Electronics Workshop, Diving Room with Hyperbaric Chamber, Probe Local and Transducer Site.
 Local Gravimetry, Spare Cloths, Oceanography Warehouse, Water Clothing Store.
 Probe nacelle, transverse propellers in bow and stern.
 Davits and Chigres: Popa Porch for Oceanography and Sónar Towed, Lateral Davit for Rosettes, Lateral Davit for Plankton Extraction.
 Possibility of stowing scientific containers in Toldilla Deck.
 Side Scanning Sónar VDS (Medium / High Frequency) and Sónar / Parametric Probe.

Characteristics of the Underwater Rescue BAM (authorized for construction at a projected cost of 166 million Euros in 2021; construction to begin in Spring 2023 and planned for delivery in 2026)
 Rescue and support to the rescue of submarines. The new rescue vessel will be known as the BAM-IS (Intervención Subacuática/Underwater Intervention).
 Support for diving operations.
 Intervention and rescue in accidents and shipwrecks.
 Surveillance and monitoring of the heritage (of growing interest in litigation with the Odyssey by the frigate "Nuestra Señora de las Mercedes" between 2007 and 2012).
 SAR operations.
 Transport of personnel and material.
 Fight against pollution.

History 

Construction began on 4 October 2007 with the cutting of the first sheet and was placed on the stands the first on 13 March 2009, in the shipyard San Fernando. The budget was €352m but the final cost was €488.4m for four units (~US$160m each).

In June 2009, the Secretary of State for Defence and Congress confirmed the construction of a second batch to replace older patrol boats of the Anaga (3), Toralla (2),  (4) and the now-retired Barceló (6) and Conejera (4) classes. In September 2010, the Ministry of Defence said a contract would be signed with Navantia for four additional vessels to be delivered by 2015, but the contract has yet to be signed. Navantia has indicated that the Batch 2 vessels will be more modular, with the potential to switch between oceanography, intelligence gathering and search-and-rescue. One will be a diving support vessel, and one will be a research vessel for hydrography and logistical support in the Antarctic. The acquisition of two vessels, to enter service in 2019, was formally approved by the Spanish cabinet on 18 July 2014 at a cost of €166.74m (US$224m) each. However, the envisaged in service date was subsequently delayed until the mid-2020s.

Ships

References 

This article contains content from the Spanish Wikipedia.

External links 
 BAM Buque de Acción Marítima - Página Oficial Armada Española
 BAM P-41 Meteoro - Página Oficial Atenea SYD
 BAM Navantia - Página Oficial Defensa.com
 Buques de Acción Marítima (BAM) - 
 

Ships of the Spanish Navy
Buque de Acción Marítima
Patrol ship classes